(born June 19, 1982) is a Japanese musician from Akita Prefecture signed to Lantis. She started her music career after winning the All-Japan Anison Grand Prix singing contest in 2009. Since then, Sasaki has performed theme songs for various anime television series, such as The Book of Bantorra, Nichijou, Garo: The Animation, So, I Can't Play H!, and Bakuon!!, among others.

Career
Sasaki participated in three auditions while in high school. She had her break in 2009 when she won the All-Japan Anison Grand Prix singing contest in 2009, beating several thousand participants. She later signed with the musical label Lantis, and in January 2010 released her first single , which was used as the second opening theme to the 2010 animated television series The Book of Bantorra. Her next two singles, "Lucky Racer/Real Star" (released in June 2010) and "Fly away t.p.s" (released in February 2011) were used as the theme songs of the Japanese variety show Lucky Racer. Her single "Zzz", released in May 2011, was used as the first ending theme to the 2011 animated television series Nichijou.

Discography
Sympathetic World (2011)
Daybreaker (2013)
Sayakaver. (2015)
Atlantico Blue (2015)
Fated Crown (2017)

References

External links
 
Official agency profile at Lantis 

1982 births
21st-century Japanese singers
21st-century Japanese women singers
Anime musicians
Lantis (company) artists
Living people
Musicians from Akita Prefecture